Bianca Joyce (née Greenshields; born 21 March 1990) is a former Australian field hockey player, who played as a midfielder.

Personal life
Bianca Joyce was born in Nantawarra, South Australia.

She married her husband, Tom, in 2013 and the pair now reside in Crystal Brook.

Career

Club level
During her career, Joyce was a member of Port Adelaide District Hockey Club before she moved to Perth, Western Australia in 2011 to join the Hockey Australia High Performance Program, as a member of the Hockeyroos squad.

Hockeyroos
Following a successful campaign in the 2010 AHL, Joyce was called up to make her debut for the Australian national team in 2011. She made her official debut in February 2011, in a test match against Argentina.

In November 2011, following her string of performances throughout the year, Joyce was named in the Hockeyroos 27 player training squad for the 2012 Olympic Games in London, United Kingdom. After failing to make the Olympics, Joyce was a member of the team at the 2012 Champions Challenge I in Dublin, Ireland, where she won a gold medal.

Joyce retired in 2013 after making 38 appearances for Australia.

International goals

References

External links

1990 births
Living people
Australian female field hockey players
Female field hockey midfielders
21st-century Australian women